"Ping Pong" (stylized in all caps) is a collaborative song recorded by South Korean singer-songwriter Hyuna and South Korean rapper Dawn, released on September 9, 2021, under P Nation, simultaneously with the accompanied music video and the EP 1+1=1.

Composition
The song was written by Hyuna and Dawn.
The song “PING PONG” is a moombahton Dance song with an intense lead sound composed of Moombahton Rhythm and 880 Bass sound. It was written and  composed jointly by Hyuna and DAWN. It is an impressive song that expresses the image of a lover in love with cute and popping lyrics, like a ping-pong ball moving back and forth.

Music video 
On September 6, a teaser for the music video of "Ping Pong" was released. On September 9, the official music video for "Ping Pong" was released into the public.

Accolades

Credits and personnel
Credits adapted from Melon.

 Hyuna – vocals, songwriting, composing, chorus
 Dawn – vocals, songwriting, composing, chorus
 Yoo Geon-hyeong – producer
 Philip Kwon - producer
 Space One – producer

Charts

Release history

References 

2021 songs
2021 singles
Songs written by Hyuna
Hyuna songs
K-pop songs
Korean-language songs